Naarath is a place named in Joshua 16:7 as one of the landmarks on the southern boundary of the Tribe of Ephraim and Benjamin. It appears to have been situated between Ataroth and Jericho. During the 4th-century, Eusebius and Jerome speak of "Naorath", as a "small village of Jews fives miles from Jericho."

References

Sources
Biblical Proportions
Easton's Bible Dictionary
New International Version Bible

Hebrew Bible places
Former populated places in the State of Palestine
Historic Jewish communities